Adelaide Airport is a suburb in the City of West Torrens west of the Adelaide city centre. The suburb was proclaimed in 1991. Almost the entire area of the suburb is taken up by the Adelaide Airport and associated businesses. There is also Harbour Town shopping centre on the western side of the suburb.

The suburb is bounded by Tapleys Hill Road on the west and Sir Donald Bradman Drive and the Anna Meares Bike Path on the north. The eastern and southern boundaries match the airport boundaries.

References

Suburbs of Adelaide